Teressa, or Taih-Long is one of the Nicobarese languages spoken on the Teressa Island of Nicobar Islands in India. Bompoka dialect (Pauhut) is distinct.  As of 2001, there are 2,080 speakers.

Teressa belongs to the Nicobarese branch of the Austroasiatic languages in which it forms a subgroup with the Chaura language.

References

Languages of India
Nicobarese languages